Kosmos 245 ( meaning Cosmos 245), known before launch as DS-P1-Yu No.16, was a Soviet satellite which was used as a radar calibration target for tests of anti-ballistic missiles. It was built by the Yuzhnoye Design Bureau, and launched in 1968 as part of the Dnepropetrovsk Sputnik programme.

Kosmos 245 was launched from Site 133/1 at the Plesetsk Cosmodrome, atop a Kosmos-2I 63SM carrier rocket. The launch occurred on 3 October 1968 at 12:58:59 UTC, and resulted in Kosmos 245's successful deployment into low Earth orbit. Upon reaching orbit, it was assigned its Kosmos designation, and received the International Designator 1968-083A.

It remained in orbit until it decayed and reentered the atmosphere on 15 January 1969. It was the sixteenth of seventy nine DS-P1-Yu satellites to be launched, and the fifteenth of seventy two to successfully reach orbit.

See also

1968 in spaceflight

References

Spacecraft launched in 1968
Kosmos satellites
Dnepropetrovsk Sputnik program